The High Commissioner of New Zealand to the United Kingdom is New Zealand's foremost diplomatic representative in the United Kingdom of Great Britain and Northern Ireland, and in charge of New Zealand's diplomatic mission in the United Kingdom.

History

The High Commission of New Zealand is located in London, the United Kingdom's capital city.  New Zealand has maintained a resident High Commissioner in the United Kingdom since 1905, and a resident Agent-General since 1871.  The High Commissioner to the United Kingdom is concurrently accredited as High Commissioner to Nigeria.

The High Commissioner was formerly accredited as ambassador of New Zealand to Ireland, which is now a resident mission in Dublin since 2018.

As New Zealand was created as a part of the British Empire, its diplomatic relationship with the United Kingdom is its longest-standing; the position of High Commissioner in London pre-dates New Zealand's Dominion status by two years, the Balfour Declaration of 1926 by 21 years, and the adoption of the Statute of Westminster of 1931 by 42 years.  New Zealand appointed a High Commissioner to Canada in 1942, and a High Commissioner to Australia in 1943.

As fellow members of the Commonwealth of Nations, diplomatic relations between New Zealand and the United Kingdom are at governmental level, rather than between Heads of State, with member countries exchanging High Commissioners, rather than Ambassadors.

List of heads of mission

The following individuals have held the office:

Table footnotes:
<noinclude>

See also

List of High Commissioners of the United Kingdom to New Zealand

References

United Kingdom, High Commissioners from New Zealand to
New Zealand
 
Ireland–New Zealand relations
New Zealand–Nigeria relations
New Zealand–United Kingdom relations
Lists of ambassadors to Nigeria
Lists of ambassadors to Ireland
Ireland and the Commonwealth of Nations
New Zealand and the Commonwealth of Nations
Nigeria and the Commonwealth of Nations
United Kingdom and the Commonwealth of Nations